County Kilkenny was a former UK Parliament county constituency in County Kilkenny in Ireland. The County constituency returned two Members of Parliaments (MPs) in the House of Commons of the United Kingdom of Great Britain and Ireland, from 1801 until 1885.

County Kilkenny constituency was an original constituency represented in Parliament when the Acts of Union 1800 by Great Britain and Ireland took effect on 1 January 1801, and remained in existence until its abolition in 1885 when it was replaced by North Kilkenny and South Kilkenny.

Boundaries
County Kilkenny constituency was made up of the traditional county except for the borough constituency of Kilkenny City for Kilkenny.

This constituency comprised the whole of County Kilkenny, except for the parliamentary borough of Kilkenny City.

Members of Parliament

Elections

Elections in the 1830s

 

Ponsonby was appointed as First Commissioner of Woods and Forests, requiring a by-election.

Elections in the 1840s

 

Bryan's death caused a by-election.

Pierce Butler's death caused a by-election.

Elections in the 1850s

Elections in the 1860s

Elections in the 1870s

Elections in the 1880s

References

The Parliaments of England by Henry Stooks Smith (1st edition published in three volumes 1844–50), 2nd edition edited (in one volume) by F.W.S. Craig (Political Reference Publications 1973)

Westminster constituencies in County Kilkenny (historic)
Constituencies of the Parliament of the United Kingdom established in 1801
Constituencies of the Parliament of the United Kingdom disestablished in 1885
Historic constituencies in County Kilkenny